Suter Glacier is a short glacier in the Mountaineer Range, Victoria Land, draining southeast into Lady Newnes Bay just south of Spatulate Ridge. Named by New Zealand Antarctic Place-Names Committee (NZ-APC) in 1966 for Douglas Suter, senior New Zealand scientist at Hallett Station, 1962–63.

Glaciers of Victoria Land
Borchgrevink Coast